Karacabey can refer to:

 Karacabey
 Karacabey, Sungurlu
 Karacabey horse
 Karacabey Belediyespor